Hebius optatus, the Mount Omei keelback,  is a species of snake of the family Colubridae. The snake is found in Vietnam and China.

References 

optatus
Reptiles of Vietnam
Reptiles of China
Reptiles described in 1966